They All Saw a Cat is a 2016 picture book written and illustrated by Brendan Wenzel.  Winner of a 2017 Caldecott Honor, They All Saw a Cat explores what a cat might look like from the perspectives of various animals' points of view.  They All Saw a Cat received a starred review from Publishers Weekly in July 2016. An animated film of the book was released in 2017 by Weston Woods, narrated by John Lithgow with music by David Mansfield. The film concludes with an interview with Wenzel.

References 

2016 children's books
American picture books
Caldecott Honor-winning works
Books about cats
Books about perception